The 2014 Yinzhou Bank Ningbo International Women's Tennis Open is a professional tennis tournament played on hard courts. It is the fifth edition of the tournament which is part of the 2014 WTA 125K series. It takes place in Ningbo, China, on 27 October – 2 November 2014.

Singles entrants

Seeds 

 1 Rankings as of 20 October 2014

Other entrants 
The following players received wildcards into the singles main draw:
  Han Xinyun
  Xu Yifan
  Yang Zhaoxuan
  Zhang Kailin

The following players received entry from the qualifying draw:
  Chan Chin-wei
  Liu Chang
  Arina Rodionova
  Wang Yan

Withdrawals 
Before the tournament
  Anna-Lena Friedsam [replaced by Tadeja Majerič]
  Sorana Cîrstea [replaced by Eri Hozumi]
  Olga Govortsova [replaced by Ekaterina Bychkova]
  Kimiko Date-Krumm [replaced by Elizaveta Kulichkova]

Doubles entrants

Seeds

Other entrants 
The following players received wildcards into the doubles draw:
  Ye Qiuyu /  Zhang Ying

Champions

Singles 

  Magda Linette def.  Wang Qiang, 3–6, 7–5, 6–1

Doubles 

  Arina Rodionova /  Olga Savchuk def.  Han Xinyun /  Zhang Kailin, 4–6, 7–6(7–2), [10–6]

External links 
 2014 Ningbo International Women's Tennis Open at wtatennis.com

2014 WTA 125K series
2014
Hard court tennis tournaments
2014 in Chinese tennis